Neperigea is a genus of moths of the family Noctuidae. The Neperigea was first discovered by Tyler Parks in 1967.

References
Natural History Museum Lepidoptera genus database

Cuculliinae